Sheniqua Thomas (born 18 May 1998) is a Barbadian netball player who represents Barbados internationally and plays in the positions of goal attack and goal shooter. She competed at the Netball World Cup on two occasions in 2015 and 2019. She also represented Barbados at the Commonwealth Games in 2014, which also marked her maiden Commonwealth Games appearance.

References 

1998 births
Living people
Barbadian netball players
Netball players at the 2014 Commonwealth Games
Commonwealth Games competitors for Barbados
2019 Netball World Cup players
2015 Netball World Cup players